Evie Millynn (born 23 November 1994) is a New Zealand footballer who plays for Western Springs AFC and for New Zealand.

College career
In 2013, Millynn started studying at San Diego State University, taking part of the San Diego State Aztecs women's soccer team.

International career
Millynn was part of New Zealand U17 roster who played in the 2010 FIFA U-17 Women's World Cup. She appeared in two matches. She was also a constant presence in the New Zealand U20 team. She was part of the roster in the 2012 FIFA U-20 Women's World Cup, where she played three matches and scored one goal. Millyn was also in the roster that represented New Zealand in the 2014 FIFA U-20 Women's World Cup, she played matches for her country. In 2015, she was called to the New Zealand 23-roster that will play in the 2015 FIFA Women's World Cup but was an unused substitute.

Personal
In March 2022 Millynn was diagnosed with COVID-19. In April 2022 Millynn permanently relocated to Melbourne, Australia.

References

External links
 
 Profile at NZF
 
 Eurosport Player profile

Living people
1994 births
Women's association football midfielders
2015 FIFA Women's World Cup players
Association footballers from Auckland
New Zealand women's association footballers
New Zealand women's international footballers